Ack Värmland is a Swedish comedy series that started broadcasting in 2015 on TV4. The show was filmed in Trollhättan and had its premiere on 13 March 2015. The series follows some characters from the small town of Molkom in Värmland. It was later revealed that because of the popularity of the show a second season would be filmed.

Cast
Mia Skäringer – Anette
Ida Hallquist – Fanny
Johan Östling – Ola
Björn A. Ling – Pontus
Tomas Tjerneld – Janne
Sussie Eriksson – Sol-Britt
Hanna Ingman – Bea
Bengt Alsterlind – Granne
Lotta Tejle – Granne

References

Swedish television sitcoms
2015 Swedish television series debuts
Värmland in fiction
2015 in Sweden